Donna Lee Custer ( Hickey, January 8, 1928 – March 22, 2021), better known as May Wynn, was an American dancer, singer, and actress.

Early life
Wynn, who grew up in Forest Hills, Queens, New York, was descended from a line of performers. Her grandfather, Bertie Black, worked as a musician in vaudeville, and her father, Ray Hickey, was a song-and-dance performer in vaudeville. She was of Irish descent. Her early jobs included modeling, working in a department store, and being a page at La Guardia Field. Outside of work, she won a variety of talent contests.

Career
Wynn began performing under her birth name at New York's Copacabana nightclub at 17. She was tested for a key supporting role in From Here to Eternity (1953), but Donna Reed played the part and won an Academy Award for her performance. In 1954, she adopted the stage name of May Wynn after she played a character of that name in The Caine Mutiny (1954). Wynn later was cast as the lead actress in the feature films The Man Is Armed and The White Squaw (both 1956), and in Jack Webb's NBC television series, Noah's Ark, in which she played opposite Paul Burke and Victor Rodman. She guest-starred on Perry Mason as Donna Sherwood in "The Case of the Glittering Goldfish" (1959). In 1958, she starred with her then-husband Jack Kelly in The Hong Kong Affair. 

Wynn worked in real estate after leaving acting, and in 1989 began work as a part-time aide with Our Lady Queen of Angels Catholic School in Newport Beach, California. In January 2018, Wynn, then known as Donna Custer, was feted by the school on her 90th birthday. A Los Angeles Times profile said that she "now uses her experience to help students at Our Lady Queen of Angels build confidence during her after-school public speaking classes," and still received fan mail.

Personal life
Wynn married actor Jack Kelly in October 1956. The couple divorced in 1964. She was married to Jack W. Custer from 1968 to 1979, when they were divorced.

Wynn died in Newport Beach, California, in March 2021 at the age of 93.

Selected filmography
The Caine Mutiny (1954)
They Rode West (1954)
The Violent Men (1955)
The White Squaw (1956)
Hong Kong Affair (1958)

References

External links

 
 AllMovie.com entry
 Glamour Girls of the Silver Screen

1928 births
2021 deaths
20th-century American actresses
Actresses from New York (state)
American Roman Catholics
American dancers
American female dancers
American film actresses
American people of Irish descent
American television actresses
California Republicans
New York (state) Republicans
People from New York City
Western (genre) film actresses
Western (genre) television actors
21st-century American women